Sperwill Ltd (sometimes Sperwill Aviation) was a British aircraft manufacturer based in Bristol and founded by Riann Oliver. The company specialized in the design and manufacture of paramotors in the form of ready-to-fly aircraft for the US FAR 103 Ultralight Vehicles rules and the European microlight category.

The company seems to have been founded about 2001 and gone out of business in 2009.

The company built a wide range of paramotors noted for their ability to be completely dismantled for ground transport. Each model used a different engine, while retaining similar frame features.

Aircraft

References

External links
Company website archives on Archive.org

Defunct aircraft manufacturers of the United Kingdom
Ultralight aircraft
Paramotors